The 2001–02 Wichita Thunder season was the 10th season of the CHL franchise in Wichita, Kansas.

Regular season

Division standings

See also
2001–02 CHL season

Wichita Thunder seasons
Wich